A speed skating rink (or speed skating oval) is an ice rink in which a speed skating competition is held.

The rink
A standard long track speed skating track is, according to the regulations of the International Skating Union (ISU), a double-laned track with two curved ends each of 180°, in which the radius of the inner curve is not less than 25 metres and not more than 26 metres. The width of the competition lanes is 4 metres. At the opposite straight of the finishing line, there is a crossing area, where the skaters must change lane.

At international competitions, the track must be 400 metres long, with a warm-up lane at least 4 metres wide inside the competition lanes. For Olympic competitions, the track must also be enclosed within a building.

The design and dimensions of a speed skating track have remained more or less unchanged since the foundation of ISU in 1892.

The speed skating track is also used for the sports of Icetrack cycling and Ice speedway

Measurement and demarcation 

The measurement of the track is made half a meter into the lane. The total length of the track is the distance a competitor skates each lap, i.e. the length of two straights, one inner curve and one outer curve, in addition to the extra distance skated when changing lanes in the cross-over area, which on a standard track equals 7 centimeters.

A 400 m track with inner radius 25.0 m has 113.57 m long straights
A 400 m track with inner radius 25.5 m has 112.00 m long straights
A 400 m track with inner radius 26.0 m has 110.43 m long straights

The demarcation of the competition lanes are made by painted lines in the ice (or a set of painted marks) and movable blocks of rubber. On outdoor tracks, snow may also be used for demarcation of the competition lanes.

Alternative speed skating tracks
Although ISU regulations state that minimum measures for a standard speed skating track, alternative track lengths may be used for competition. The minimum requirements are track length on 200 meters, radius of inner curve of 15  meters and width of the competition lanes 2 meters.

Short track speed skating tracks have a length of 111.111 metres (364.54 ft). The rink is 60 metres (200 ft) long by 30 metres (98 ft) wide, which is the same size as an international-sized ice hockey rink.

Combination with other sports

Many speed skating venues have ice hockey rinks or no ice area at all inside the oval. A few are suitable also for bandy, like Hamar Olympic Hall, Ice Palace Krylatskoye, and Medeu. The Beijing National Speed Skating Oval in Beijing, China, which is in the process of being built for the 2022 Winter Olympics, is also designed appropriately for that sport. There is a growing cooperation between International Skating Union and Federation of International Bandy, since both have an interest in more indoor venues with large ice surfaces being built. In Norway there is an agreement in place, stating that an indoor arena intended primarily for either bandy or long track speed skating, shall have ice surface for the other sport as well.

Indoor speed skating tracks 
 
Below is a complete list of the indoor 400 m speed skating tracks around the world. The data presented are retrieved from the online database Speed Skating News.

Note: The Richmond Olympic Oval was dismantled upon completion of the 2010 Winter Olympics and is no longer used for speed skating. However, if the need arises the speed skating rink can be reinstalled.

Other major speed skating tracks 
In the table below, some of the world's major outdoor speed skating tracks still in use are listed. This is not a complete list of speed skating venues, but lists most of the outdoor tracks used for world cup competitions and championships the past years. The data in the table are retrieved from the Speed Skating News database.

References

Gallery

See also
Long track speed skating
Figure skating rink
Ice hockey rink
Ice rink

Speed skating
 *
Sports venues by type